Imhotep is a crater on Mercury. It has a diameter of 159 kilometers. Its name was adopted by the International Astronomical Union in 1976. Imhotep is named for the Ancient Egyptian architect Imhotep, who lived from 2686 to 2613 BCE.

References

Impact craters on Mercury